The College of IT & Management Education, Bhubaneswar, is a public university  established in August 2000. The Institution provides professional postgraduate degree education in the areas of business management and information technology as a state governmental business school in eastern Odisha.The institute is a constituent of Biju Patnaik University of Technology (BPUT) under AICTE and State Government of Odisha.

Overview
The College of IT & Management Education was established as a self-sustaining institution, initially funded with capital for land and buildings with promotion of infrastructure and funds by Odisha State Electronics Development Corporation Ltd. which ran under the Information Technology Department for the government of Odisha. In February 2006, the institute was transferred to the Industries Department in a decision by the state cabinet of Odisha as an affiliated college under Biju Patnaik University of Technology. CIME has been running on a self-financing basis since inception in August 2000. It is one of the six constituent colleges of BPUT.

Academic programs
CIME has been offering two years full-time MCA (Master in Computer Application) since the academic session 2001–02 with due approval of AICTE and Government of Odisha. From the academic session 2005–06, CIME has been offering a two years full-time Master in Business Administration (MBA) with the approval of AICTE and Government of Odisha. CIME takes candidates only through Odisha Joint Entrance Examination (OJEE) Counseling.

Intake capacity: 
 MBA - 120 (2 years regular)
 MCA - 60 (3 years regular)  
 MBA (part-time) 3 years 
 LE-MCA (for B.Sc. (IT/CS)/BCA) 2 years 
 M.Tech. (CSE) - 18 (2 years)

Admission procedure
Students for postgraduate degree in Master in Business Administration and Master in Computer Applications are admitted through Odisha Joint Entrance Examination.

References

All India Council for Technical Education
Engineering colleges in Odisha
Science and technology in Bhubaneswar
Business schools in Odisha
Universities and colleges in Bhubaneswar
Colleges affiliated with Biju Patnaik University of Technology
Educational institutions established in 2000
2000 establishments in Orissa